24 de Diciembre  is a corregimiento in Panamá District, Panamá Province, Panama with a population of 65,404 as of 2010. It was created by Law 13 of February 6, 2002.

References

Corregimientos of Panamá Province
Panamá District